Amy Yarnell Rossman (born September 20, 1946 in Spokane, Washington) is an American mycologist and a leading expert in identifying fungi.

Biography
Born in Spokane, Amy Rossman moved with her family, when she was six months old, to Portland, Oregon and considers herself to be a native Oregonian. Rossman graduated with a B.A. in biology from Grinnell College in 1968. She received her Ph.D. in mycology in 1975 from Oregon State University (OSU). Her Ph.D. thesis The genus Ophionectria (Ascomycetes, Hypocreales) was supervised by William C. Denison (1929–2005). As a graduate student she collected fungi in June 1970 in Puerto Rico's El Yunque National Forest and in Dominica and then in January 1971 in Jamaica. She held a teaching fellowship in mycology from 1978 to 1978 at Cornell University. From 1979 to 1980 she was a research associate in botany at New York Botanical Garden (NYBG). During the years from 1978 to 1980 she collected fungi in the neotropics.  From 1980 to 1983 she worked as a mycologist for the USDA's Animal and Plant Health Inspection Service. In 1983 she became a mycologist for the USDA's Agricultural Research Service and was appointed director of the U.S. National Fungus Collections.
 In the late 1980s the Systematic Botany and Mycology Laboraty (SBML) was formed and she was appointed the SBML's research leader.

In French Guiana on a 1986 expedition sponsored by the Biological Diversity of the Guiana Shield Program, Rossman met the French botanist Christian P. Feuillet. They married in King County, Washington on the 4th of September 1988. They have a daughter.

In 1996 Rossman told the science journalist Carol Kaesuk Yoon that for some types of organisms, such as microfungi, New York state's forests are almost as unexplored as the tropical forests. Rossman, with coauthor David L. Hawksworth, suggested that about 1.4 million fungal species were undescribed as of 1997.

In 2009 Rossman became the research leader of the Systematic Mycology and Microbiology Laboratory (SMML) in Beltsville, Maryland. She has also been director and curator of the U.S. National Fungus Collections (BPI — USDA Bureau of Plant Industry), which are located at the SMML. The SMML and the U.S. National Fungus Collections are part of the USDA's Agricultural Research Service. She led research on Hypocreales (particularly Calonectria, Nectria and Ophionectria), Diaporthales and other microfungi that cause plant diseases. She made important collections, not only with her husband, but also with Laurence Skog and Gary Joseph Samuels. Together with David F. Farr, she manages a database containing information about the fungal specimens in the U.S. National Fungus Collections. They also maintain a database with data on fungi that have plants as hosts.  She has contributed extensively to the Index Fungorum.

Rossman retired in 2014 from her USDA position. In retirement she has lived in Corvallis, Oregon, where she has an office at Oregon State University. She is on the editorial board of the mycological journal Studies in Mycology.

She was elected in 2004 a Fellow of the American Association for the Advancement of Science (AAAS).

Books

References

External links
 

1946 births
Living people
American mycologists
20th-century American women scientists
21st-century American women scientists
Women mycologists
Grinnell College alumni
Oregon State University alumni
United States Department of Agriculture people
Fellows of the American Association for the Advancement of Science